The 2009 ANZ Championship season was the second season of the ANZ Championship. The 2009 season began on 4 April and concluded on 26 July. Melbourne Vixens were minor premiers. With a team co-captained by Bianca Chatfield and Sharelle McMahon, Vixens subsequently defeated Waikato Bay of Plenty Magic 58–43 in the major semi-final and Adelaide Thunderbirds 54–46 in the grand final to finish as overall premiers. The grand final was played on Sunday 26 July at Hisense Arena.

Transfers

Head coaches and captains

Pre-season tournaments

Notes
  No final. Played as a round-robin tournament.

Regular season
During the regular season the Australian teams played each other twice and the New Zealand teams once. The New Zealand teams also played each other twice and each of the Australian teams once. Melbourne Vixens won 12 of their 13 matches during the regular season. Their only defeat came in Round 10 against Waikato Bay of Plenty Magic, their main challengers for top spot. Vixens had to win their final two home matches with plenty of goals to guarantee top place. After a 63–35 win against Canterbury Tactix in Round 13, Vixens' defeated Central Pulse 80–39 in Round 14 to secure the minor premiership.

Round 1

Round 2

Round 3

Round 4

Round 5

Round 6

Round 7

Round 8

Round 9

Round 10

Round 11

Round 12

Round 13: Rivalry Round
Round 13 featured five Australia verses New Zealand matches. Goals scored by Australian and New Zealand teams were added together and the country with the most goals won the Rivalry Round Trophy. During the round, Waikato Bay of Plenty Magic became the first New Zealand team to win in Australia, defeating West Coast Fever 49–38. After 24 games, Central Pulse won their first match, defeating the reigning champions New South Wales Swifts 53–52.  	
Southern Steel became the third New Zealand team to secure a win when they defeated Adelaide Thunderbirds 58-49. Despite New Zealand teams winning three of the five matches, Australia won the Rivalry Round Trophy 261–252.

Round 14

Final table

Playoffs

Major semi-final

Minor semi-final

Preliminary final

Grand final

Award winners

ANZ Championship awards

Australian Netball Awards

Media coverage
In 2009 the ANZ Championship TV partners included Network 10 and One HD in Australia and Sky Sport (New Zealand). Television audiences were up 52% across Australia and New Zealand, from 5.8 million to 8.8 million. During the season, an average of 229,000 viewers watched per game. The grand final TV audience peaked at 354,329 viewers and the cumulative audience across both countries was over 11 million. Before the Round 12 match between New South Wales Swifts and West Coast Fever, Sydney Olympic Park Sports Centre hosted a charity match, billed as Netball's Festival of Stars. The match was viewed by a television audience of 345,164 viewers.

Gallery

References

 
2009
2009 in New Zealand netball
2009 in Australian netball